Michael Stone (born December 29, 1958) is an on-air host for 97.1 The Ticket WXYT-FM. He is the former host of the Stoney and Wojo radio show on WDFN in Detroit, Michigan until it was canceled on January 20, 2009. He was a blogger and chat host on mlive.com until signing with 97.1 in December 2009. Stone also appears weekly on WXYZ-TV's Sunday night sports newscast to offer his editorial opinion on the latest sports issues.

Stone began his sports journalism career as a television producer for The George Michael Sports Machine in Washington, D.C. He attended American University and worked at WRC-TV for George Michael after graduating. He came to Detroit to work as the sports producer for WDIV-TV. He was an original on-air personality of WDFN when it changed its format to all sports on July 11, 1994. He first worked with Detroit News reporter Rob Parker. Beginning in the late 1990s, he partnered with Detroit News columnist Bob Wojnowski.  Prior to joining WXYT-FM, Stone worked with Detroit Free Press columnist Mitch Albom on The Sunday Sports Albom, Albom's sports talk radio show which at that time was being broadcast on WLLZ, a now defunct Detroit FM rock station. Personally, Stone is Jewish and married to Cyndi, an occupational therapist, and has twin daughters, Jessica and Marissa. They live in West Bloomfield, Michigan. He is a dedicated Bruce Springsteen fan.

The Stoney and Wojo show

The Stoney and Wojo show was a three-hour radio broadcast that included listener call-in segments, regular guests, and current affairs talk slanted towards the Detroit and Michigan sports fan. The tone of Stoney and Wojo was light-hearted, with Stone playing straight man to Wojo's more clownish comments.  The heart of the show was sports and the breaking news of the Detroit sports market was paramount. Included were interviews, where the professional journalism strengths of both Stone and Wojnowski come to the fore. Occasionally, political news was featured: Governor Jennifer Granholm appeared several times, for example.

Stone had a distinctive, entertaining and knowledgeable on-air presence that came to represent WDFN and the Detroit sports market. He often appeared on national media outlets to discuss Detroit sports events, such as the Pacers–Pistons brawl. He had been a guest several times on the nationally syndicated Jim Rome Show. Additionally, on July 13, 2007 Stoney and Wojo filled in as hosts for Rome's show.

Stoney and Wojo conducted an annual 28-hour radiothon in support of research for a cure of leukemia and lymphoma. The event was started when Sabrina Black, WDFN update reporter, was diagnosed with lymphoma, and continued after her long battle with the disease lead to her death in 2006. It was typically held in a Metro Detroit restaurant and includes many regular guest appearances including Tony Dungy and Joe Dumars, among many others.
 
In August 2009, rumors of a revived WDFN live local sports talk line up surfaced; however, in September Stoney and Wojo's time slot was filled by Matt Shepard and Drew Sharp.

In January 2010 he was listed as a possible replacement to Jay Towers on the 97.1 The Ticket Morning show.

References

External links

Sabrina Black Fund for research in Leukemia and Lymphoma.

American sports radio personalities
Radio personalities from Detroit
Radio personalities from Philadelphia
20th-century American Jews
1958 births
Living people
People from West Bloomfield, Michigan
21st-century American Jews